MethDB is a database for DNA methylation data.

See also
 DNA methylation
 MethBase
 NGSmethDB

References

External links
 http://www.methdb.de

Epigenetics
DNA
Genetics databases